Naan is 1967 Indian Tamil-language masala film, directed by T. R. Ramanna and written by T. N. Balu. The film stars Ravichandran, Jayalalithaa, Muthuraman and Nagesh. It focuses on a raja's failed attempt to find his lost son, and three men who claim to be the lost son, seeking rights to the raja's properties.

Naan was released on 1 November 1967, and ran for over 175 days in theatres. It was remade in Telugu as Nenante Nene (1968) and in Hindi as Waris (1969).

Plot 

A raja's son gets lost at a young age while trying to escape his father's enemy. His father futilely searches for his son for a few years and dies. Years later, three people visit the palace claiming to be the prince and seek rights to all properties. All three unanimously have the identities of the lost son and answer all questions related to the family history. The palace management are left with no choice but to accommodate all three men unless they find the true heir.

The story takes a complete turn when it is revealed that none of them are the true heir and there is a fourth person who is the real prince, whose whereabouts are unknown. The only way to reach the real prince is via these three people who know his whereabouts.

Cast 
 Ravichandran as Sekar/Chinnaraja
 Jayalalithaa as Geetha
 Muthuraman as Kumar/Chinnaraja
 Vijayasri as Parimalam
 Sriranjani as Kamakshi
 Manohar as Singaram
 Ashokan as Lal
 Nagesh as Sundaram
 Manorama as Mohini
 Suruli Rajan as Sundaralingam
 Ennathe Kannaiah as Uthandaraman
 Samikannu as Velu/Vels
 Muthulakshmi as Rajamma
 Baby Padmini as Ammu/Baby
 B. V. Radha as Sheela
 Madhavi as Bora

Production 
Naan was colourised using Eastmancolor. While portraying his character, Nagesh wore new glasses without removing the price label tag; although Ramanna wanted it removed, Nagesh decided to keep the tag for comic effect.

Soundtrack 
Music was composed by T. K. Ramamoorthy and lyrics were written by Kannadasan and Vaali. The song "Vaandhal Ennodu Ingey" is based on the title track from the American film, Come September (1961).

Release and reception 
Naan was released on 1 November 1967, Diwali day and ran for 175 days in theatres. Kalki appreciated the film for Ramanna's direction and the innovative story.

References

External links 
 

1960s masala films
1960s Tamil-language films
1967 films
Films directed by T. R. Ramanna
Films scored by T. K. Ramamoorthy
Tamil films remade in other languages